Templo de Nuestra Señora de Aranzazú is a church in Centro, Guadalajara, in the Mexican state of Jalisco.

References

Buildings and structures in Guadalajara, Jalisco
Centro, Guadalajara
Churches in Mexico